TVB City, is the headquarters of Television Broadcasts Limited (TVB) developed by Sun Hung Kai Properties located at 77 Chun Choi Street in the Tseung Kwan O Industrial Estate, Tseung Kwan O, Kowloon.

The HK$2.2 billion facility officially opened on 12 October 2003, with Chief Executive Tung Chee-hwa and TVB chairman Raymond Chow in attendance. The 110,000 square-metre facility, which replaced TV City, was designed to allow for future developments such as digital television production. The facilities include an 11-story broadcasting centre, workshops, a newsroom, a satellite antenna farm, two outdoor shooting sites and 22 production studios, of which "Studio 1" is one of the largest studio amongst all commercial television broadcasters in Asia.

Facilities
 24/7 News and Information which Basement Block - used for news and information which car park opening 24-hours 7-days a week.
 Outdoor Shooting Sites - features buildings for traditional Chinese town and generic early 20th century Hong Kong settings
 Workshop Block
 Main Block - along with Studio Road, it is often used as generic office building/hotel scenes for TVB's modern dramas
 Variety Studio Block - used for shooting variety and specials
 Drama Studio Block - used for shooting drama shows
 Satellite Antenna Farm

References

External links

TVB City Grand Opening
The pedestrian wind comfort study at the Hong Kong TVB City

 
Buildings and structures in Hong Kong
Tseung Kwan O
Television studios
Hong Kong film studios
Buildings and structures completed in 2003
2003 establishments in Hong Kong